John Purvey (by 1525 – 21 April 1583), of Wormley, Hertfordshire, was an English politician.

He was a Member (MP) of the Parliament of England for Huntingdon in October 1553, Horsham in November 1554, Hertfordshire in 1558, and Higham Ferrers in 1559 and 1563.

References

1583 deaths
Members of the Parliament of England for Hertfordshire
People from the Borough of Broxbourne
English MPs 1553 (Mary I)
Year of birth uncertain
English MPs 1554–1555
English MPs 1558
English MPs 1559
English MPs 1563–1567